Parliamentary elections were held in the Faroe Islands on 8 November 1984. They were won by the Social Democratic Party, whose leader Atli Dam became Prime Minister.

Results

References

Elections in the Faroe Islands
Faroe Islands
General
Faroe Islands
Election and referendum articles with incomplete results